Edmondo Ballotta (21 December 1930) is a former Italian male pole vaulter who won six national titles at individual senior level.

Biography
Ballotta competed in the pole vault in two finals at the European Championships. He is the husband of the former Italian discus thrower Elivia Ricci.

Achievements

National titles
He won 6 national championships at individual senior level.
Italian Athletics Championships
Pole vault: 1952, 1954, 1955, 1956, 1957, 1958

References

External links
 Un raro documento dall'Archivio Bonomelli: i fogli del salto con l'asta degli Europei Berna 1954 

1930 births
Italian male pole vaulters
Living people